Sin City is the second full-length album by American industrial rock band Genitorturers.

Track listing
  "Sin City" - 3:39
  "Terrorvision" - 4:37
  "Liar's Lair" - 3:53
  "One Who Feeds" - 5:22
  "Squealer" (AC/DC Cover) - 4:37
  "4 Walls Black" - 3:26
  "Asphyxiate" - 4:51
  "Razor Cuts" - 3:44
  "Level 3" - 4:10
  "Crucified" - 4:06

Personnel 
 Gen - vocals
 Evil D - bass
 Chains - guitars
 Racci Shay - drums
 Vinnie Saletto - keyboards

1998 albums
Genitorturers albums
Cleopatra Records albums